Springville High School is one of the two high schools that serves and is located in Springville, Utah, United States.

Mascot
Springville High School's mascot is" Red Devils". Two incorrect versions of the origin of the mascot name have been proposed. One of those is based on a 1936 report in the local paper (The Springville Herald) that is based on an individual's memory not consistent with historical fact. The first reference in the press to anything resembling "Red Devils" dates back to 1923 during a tournament of state basketball champions from several western states, where the Springville starters were said to have "played like demons". Springville had won the state basketball championship in 1917 and again in 1923. The earliest use of the "Red Devil" moniker occur in Springville Herald reports of the 1926 Springville High football season.
 
The second incorrect story is often circulated that the mascot name comes from the original construction of the school, when the Red Devil Cement Company allegedly assisted with the building, including an actual cement bag with the Red Devil Cement logo on it that can be found in one of the display cases in the high school.

The mascot has come under fire multiple times, the most recent opposition occurring when some local citizens organized a committee called "Parents for Mascot Review". One stated issue is that a devil is a symbol of evil; another is the racial connotations. In a letter to Nebo School District, the president of the Navajo Nation stated that "the use of the term 'Red Devils' lends or conveys the immediate opinion of assertion of offensive racial commentary."

Athletics

Springville High school has done well in many sports. The Red Devils have posted region championships in girls' tennis, girls' cross country, girls' soccer, boys' golf, volleyball, boys' swimming, boys' cross country, football, and girls' basketball.

The Red Devil swim team won back-to-back boys' 4A state championships in 2008 and 2009. The championships of 2008 and 2009 mark the first time a boys' team of any sport at SHS has won back-to-back titles.   

The boys' basketball team won the 2017 4A basketball championship, under Coach Justin Snell, for the first time since 1958. In 2020, the boys' basketball team won the 5A state, Coach Snell's second title in four years. The girls' basketball team was 5A runner up. In 2021 the girls team snatch the 5A state title.

In 2017, the boys' track team won the 4A state title and followed by the 5A title in 2018.

In 2016, the Springville High School Boys Cross Country won the at large bid to go to the prestigious Nike Cross National race. The team ended up placing 15th overall. The following year the team placed 5th at the race. The cross country team has seen a lot of success in recent years with Head Coach Samantha Smith. In 2017 the boys' team won the 5A state championship; the first time Springville High School Boys ever won a cross country state championship title. The girls' team won the 5A state title in 2018, 2019, 2020, and 2021. They qualified to compete at the Nike Cross Virtual -the COVID-19 substitute for Nike Cross National. The team ended up placing 5th overall. In the 2019, 2020, and 2021 region eight Cross Country meet, Springville “swept” the meet by winning first place in all the races. Coach Smith has five cross country state titles from the past five years.

Springville High School's marching band has also won many competitions.

Notable alumni

 Don Bluth, animator, film producer and director
 William R. Bradford, General Authority of the LDS Church
 George Dewey Clyde, Governor of Utah
 Creed Haymond (1893–1983), Olympic and world-record track athlete
 Eli Herring, of the National Football League
 Bryan Johnson, founder of Braintree, OS Fund and Kernel
 Wendell B. Mendenhall, the "father" of the Polynesian Cultural Center 
 Scott Mitchell, of the National Football League
 Roger Reid, college basketball coach (BYU, Snow College, Southern Utah University) and NBA assistant coach (Phoenix Suns)

See also
Nebo School District

References
</ref> Utah High School Activities Association Records; 1923-03-16 Provo Daily Herald | | Page 1
https://www.deseret.com/platform/amp/2019/10/23/20926407/high-school-cross-country-farmington-boys-springville-girls-claim-5a-state-titles
https://www.heraldextra.com/sports/high-school/cross-country/springville-girls-cross-country-earns-team-title-gardner-races-to/article_e89eb675-575a-5054-b033-c724f1127481.html

External links

 
 Nebo School District website

Public high schools in Utah
Schools in Utah County, Utah
1902 establishments in Utah
Educational institutions established in 1902
Buildings and structures in Springville, Utah